Andarab is district located in the southern part of Baghlan Province, Afghanistan. The estimated population of Andarab in 2004 was roughly 120,642. In 2002, it was estimated that Tajiks 100% of the district's population but records show that Hazaras and Uzbeks of Afghanistan are also habitants of Andarab. The district centre is the village of Andarab, which is named after the Andarab valley in which it is located.

History
Andarab district is one of the three districts recaptured by the National Resistance Front of Afghanistan after the Taliban took over Kabul. On 24 August 2021, according to the Deccan Herald, it was recaptured by the second resistance. The next day, the claim by the anti-Taliban resistance that they had recaptured Andarab was reported by BBC reporter Yalda Hakim, without verifying it, on her Twitter page. On 26 August, both sides agreed on a ceasefire and also agreed to solve all problems through dialogue. At the time Taliban claimed to have taken Panjshir Province on September 6, 2021, the National Resistance Front and local tribal militias were still reported to have retaken the Andarab District and two other adjoining districts in Baghlan. On September 7, fighting was still reported in the district.

Climate
Andarab has a warm-summer humid continental climate (Köppen climate classification Dsb). In winter there is more rainfall than in summer. About  of precipitation falls annually.

References

External links
 Map of Settlements United Nations, AIMS, May 2002

Districts of Baghlan Province